The Trio Sonata for Two Flutes in A minor, F. 49, BR B15, is one of three trio sonatas for paired flutes and basso continuo composed c. 1740 by Wilhelm Friedemann Bach while organist at the Dresden Sophienkirche. The manuscript is in the Central State Archives Museum of Literature and Arts of Ukraine in Kyiv.

There are two movements:
Allegro
Larghetto (fragment)

An attempt to complete the second movement and add a third was published in the 1990s.

It has been recorded by Jean-Pierre Rampal, with Isaac Stern on violin, taking the second flute part.

References

Compositions by Wilhelm Friedemann Bach
Bach, WF
Instrumental duets
Compositions in A minor
1740 compositions